Cam Pipes is a Canadian musician who performed as the lead vocalist and bassist in the heavy metal band 3 Inches of Blood. He performs a falsetto vocal style reminiscent of Udo Dirkschneider and King Diamond. Pipes was the only member of 3 Inches of Blood to have been featured on all of their albums, although he was not a founding member of the band.

Pipes' influences include Judas Priest, Iron Maiden, Twisted Sister, Led Zeppelin, Deep Purple, Accept and classical music.

Pipes formerly played bass for black metal band Allfather.

Pipes was also known for playing El Diablo Azul on all three Meat Market films.

He was a guest star in the musical comedy Metalocalypse on Cartoon Network's Adult Swim.

References

External links 
 3 Inches of Blood Gallery on Alberta Stars

Living people
Canadian heavy metal singers
Canadian heavy metal bass guitarists
Canadian male singers
Canadian tenors
Musicians from Vancouver
Male bass guitarists
3 Inches of Blood members
Year of birth missing (living people)